The 1969–70 Australian region cyclone season was an above-average tropical cyclone season. It ran from 1 November 1969 to 30 April 1970. The regional tropical cyclone operational plan also defines a "tropical cyclone year" separately from a "tropical cyclone season", with the "tropical cyclone year" for this season lasting from 1 July 1969 to 30 June 1970.

Season summary

Systems

Cyclone Blossom

A weak tropical cyclone, Blossom formed on November 8 to the northwest of Cocos Islands. It dissipated, the next day.

Cyclone Diane-Francoise

A tropical low formed on January 3. It soon developed to become Cyclone Diane, before crossing to the South-West Indian Ocean basin on January 9.

Severe Tropical Cyclone Ada

Tropical Cyclone Ada was a Category 3 cyclone that killed 14 people when it hit Queensland's Whitsunday Island Resorts and the adjacent Whitsunday Coast mainland on January 17, 1970.

Resorts and boats were destroyed or severely damaged at Hayman, Daydream and South Molle Islands, as well as the two resorts – Happy Bay and Palm Bay – on Long Island. About 80% of buildings in the mainland centres of Shute Harbour, Airlie Beach and Cannonvale were severely damaged. Some damage occurred also inland at Proserpine where, following 24-hours of heavy rain that accompanied the storm,  the Proserpine River peaked at 11.16 metres: its highest recorded flood. Fourteen people died and property damage was estimated at A$390 million (1997 values).

Like Tropical Cyclone Tracy that devastated Darwin on Christmas Eve 1974, Ada was small in diameter (estimated width 30 km) and damage from her path was limited to a comparatively small geographical area. The wind from Tropical Cyclone Ada was not felt in Bowen (60 km to the north) or Mackay (120 km to the south).  However, the heavy rains did cause flooding in the Pioneer River (Mackay) and the Don River (Bowen). Before degenerating into a rainstorm Cyclone Ada travelled further inland to the Cathu State Forest (83 km north-west of Mackay behind the small Bruce Highway township of Calen) and caused extensive damage to the eucalypts, rainforest and pine plantations in that area.

It was as a result of complaints about the lack of timely warning about the 1970 cyclone that the Bureau of Meteorology introduced the cyclone warning siren that now accompanies all media broadcasts and telecasts of cyclone warnings in Queensland.

Cyclone Glynis

Cyclone Glynis formed on January 27 near the Northern Territory. It moved to the southwest before crossing the coast, near Mandurah, Western Australia. It was last noted on February 6. There were no damages and fatalities reported.

Cyclone Harriet-Iseult

Harriet formed in the western portion of the basin on February 2, strengthening to a tropical storm before moving on the South-West Indian Ocean basin on the next day, where it was renamed Iseult.

Cyclone Ingrid

Cyclone Ingrid developed on February 9 near Western Australia. It crossed the coast near Carnarvon, Western Australia on an unknown date, causing severe agricultural damage. It was last noted on February 17, to the west-northwest of Perth.

Cyclone Judy

Cyclone Judy was first seen on February 9, developing in the central Indian Ocean. Peaking as a Category 1- equivalent hurricane, it executed a small counterclockwise loop before it was last noted on February 24.

Cyclone Dawn

Cyclone Dawn formed on February 10 in the Gulf of Carpentaria, before moving inland. It moved offshore towards the Coral Sea and continued its westward motion. Then it turned to the south until it was last noted on February 19. It affected the Far North Queensland and New Caledonia with heavy rain.

Cyclone Florence

A weak cyclone, Florence developed on February 10 in the Coral Sea. It was last noted, two days later.

Cyclone Cindy

Another tropical cyclone, Cindy formed on March 15 in the Gulf of Carpentaria. It was last seen on March 20.

Cyclone Kathy-Michelle

Cyclone Kathy formed on March 19 in the central Indian Ocean. It moved to the west-southwest before moving on the South-West Indian Ocean basin on March 25, where it was redesignated as Tropical Cyclone Michelle.

Cyclone Isa

Tropical Cyclone Isa formed on April 14 near the Solomon Islands. It impacted the island country before it was last noted as it moved out of the basin into the South Pacific basin on April 19.

Cyclone Lulu

Cyclone Lulu formed on May 4 to the west of Port Hedland. It moved to the west before striking Western Australia, near Mundabullangana on May 8. It was last noted near Whim Creek, the next day.

It caused flooding around the Pilbara region; however, it was unknown if there are reports of fatalities attributed to the cyclone.

Other systems
On November 14, a tropical low formed and lasted until the next day. Another tropical low developed on March 1 and was last noted on March 5.

Season effects

See also

 Atlantic hurricane seasons: 1969, 1970 
 Eastern Pacific hurricane seasons: 1969, 1970 
 Western Pacific typhoon seasons: 1969, 1970 
 North Indian Ocean cyclone seasons: 1969, 1970

References

Australian region cyclone seasons
 disasters in Australia
 disasters in Australia
 disasters in Oceania
 disasters in Oceania